Solnik Point (‘Nos Solnik’ \'nos 'sol-nik\) is a rocky point projecting 550 m from the northwest coast of Low Island in the South Shetland Islands, Antarctica.  Forming the south side of the entrance to Kazichene Cove.  Situated 4.1 km southwest of Cape Wallace and 11.15 km north of Cape Garry.

The point is named after the settlement of Solnik in northeastern Bulgaria.

Location
British mapping in 2009.

Maps
 South Shetland Islands: Smith and Low Islands. Scale 1:150000 topographic map No. 13677. British Antarctic Survey, 2009.
 Antarctic Digital Database (ADD). Scale 1:250000 topographic map of Antarctica. Scientific Committee on Antarctic Research (SCAR), 1993–2016.

References
 Solnik Point. SCAR Composite Gazetteer of Antarctica.
 Bulgarian Antarctic Gazetteer. Antarctic Place-names Commission. (details in Bulgarian, basic data in English)

External links
 Solnik Point. Copernix satellite image

Headlands of the South Shetland Islands
Bulgaria and the Antarctic